Sven Anton Lander (born April 24, 1991) is a Swedish professional ice hockey centre for Timrå IK of the Swedish Hockey League (SHL). Lander was drafted in the second round, 40th overall, at the 2009 NHL Entry Draft by the Edmonton Oilers.

Playing career
Lander broke into the Swedish Elitserien during the 2007–08 season as a centre for Timrå IK. He had also represented Timrå in the junior league between the 2006–07 and 2008–09 seasons. Lander was named one of the alternate captains for the team on 22 September 2009. Before leaving Sweden, Lander played for Timrå IK in the Elitserien, where his father, Anders "Ante" Karlsson was the head coach.

On 28 April 2011, Lander signed a three-year, entry-level contract with the Edmonton Oilers and committed to play in North America from the 2011–12 season.

Lander scored his first NHL point, an assist on Lennart Petrell's first NHL goal, on 3 November 2011, against the Los Angeles Kings. Lander's first career NHL goal was scored on 17 November 2011, a short-handed goal against Craig Anderson of the Ottawa Senators.

Demoted to the Oilers' farm team in Bakersfield in 2016 and later placed on waivers, Lander signed a contract on 25 May 2017 with Ak Bars Kazan of the KHL.

After two productive seasons with Ak Bars, Lander left as a free agent following the 2018–19 campaign to sign a two-year contract with Lokomotiv Yaroslavl on 1 May 2019.

On 17 May 2021, Lander joined EV Zug of the National League (NL) on a one-year deal with an option for a second season. In the 2021–22 season, Lander quickly adapted to the Swiss league and contributed offensively with 12 goals and 31 points through 42 regular season games. He added two assists through the post-season, helping Zug claim the NL Championship.

On 4 April 2022, Lander, having opted to leave Switzerland, decided to return to Sweden and sign a three-year contract with his original club, Timrå IK of the SHL.

International play
Lander represented Sweden in the 2010 World Junior Championships held in Saskatchewan, Canada. He served as an alternate captain for the Swedish entry.

Career statistics

Regular season and playoffs

International

Awards and honours

References

External links

1991 births
Living people
Ak Bars Kazan players
Bakersfield Condors players
Edmonton Oilers draft picks
Edmonton Oilers players
Lokomotiv Yaroslavl players
Oklahoma City Barons players
Ice hockey players at the 2018 Winter Olympics
Ice hockey players at the 2022 Winter Olympics
Olympic ice hockey players of Sweden
People from Timrå Municipality
Swedish ice hockey centres
Timrå IK players
EV Zug players
Sportspeople from Västernorrland County